The year 1728 in architecture involved some significant events.

Events
 October 20–23 – Copenhagen Fire of 1728.

Buildings and structures

Buildings

 Catedral de Nuestra Señora de la Expectación in San Luis Potosí, Mexico, is completed.
 Seaton Delaval Hall in Northumberland, designed by Sir John Vanbrugh (died 1726), is completed.
 White Lodge, Richmond Park, near London, designed by Roger Morris, is completed as Stone Lodge.
 St John's, Smith Square in London, designed by Thomas Archer, is completed for the Commission for Building Fifty New Churches.

Publications
 James Gibbs' A Book of Architecture, containing designs of buildings and ornaments is published in London, including a version of the Gibbs surround.

Awards
 Grand Prix de Rome, architecture: Antoine-Victor Desmarais.

Births
 February 12 – Étienne-Louis Boullée (died 1799)
 February 25 – John Wood, the Younger (died 1782)
 July 3 – Robert Adam (died 1792)
 Richard Jupp (died 1799)

Deaths
 April 10 – Nicodemus Tessin the Younger (born 1654)
 date unknown – Giovanni Barbara, Maltese architect and military engineer (born 1642)

References 

architecture
Years in architecture
18th-century architecture